Kekertelung Island is an uninhabited island in the Qikiqtaaluk Region of Nunavut, Canada. It is located in Baffin Island's Cumberland Sound. Anarnittuq Island lis to its west. Aupaluktok Island, Iglunga Island, and Nunatak Island are in the vicinity.

References

External links 
 Kekertelung Island in the Atlas of Canada - Toporama; Natural Resources Canada

Islands of Baffin Island
Islands of Cumberland Sound
Uninhabited islands of Qikiqtaaluk Region